The 2010–11 Rapid City Rush season was the third season of the CHL franchise in Rapid City, South Dakota.

Regular season

Conference standings

Awards and records

Awards

Milestones

Transactions

See also
 2010–11 CHL season

References

External links
 2010–11 Rapid City Rush season at Pointstreak

R
R